Zaydism is a branch of Shia Islam that emerged in the eighth century following Zayd ibn Ali‘s unsuccessful rebellion against the Umayyad Caliphate. In contrast to other Shia Muslims of Twelver Shi'ism and Isma'ilism, Zaydis, also sometimes incorrectly called Fivers, consider Zayd to be the Imam to whom obedience is obligatory, due to him being a patrilinial descendent of Fatima and making the Call (Dawah) to jihad, two necessary qualities for an Imam of Obedience for the Zaydis.

Origin
The Zaydi madhhab emerged in reverence of Zayd's failed uprising against the Umayyad Caliph, Hisham (ruling 724–743 AD), which set a precedent for revolution against corrupt rulers. According to Hussein Badreddin al-Houthi, Zaydis find it difficult to "sit in their houses" and remain passive in an unjust world.

Zaydis are the oldest branch of the shia and are currently the second largest group after Twelvers. Zaydis do not believe in the infallibility of Imāms and do not ascribe them with any supernatural qualities, but promote their leadership. They also reject the notion of nass imamate found in Twelver Shi'ism and Isma'ili Shi'ism. Zaydis believe that Zayd ibn Ali in his last hour was betrayed by the people in Kufa. Zaydis as of 2014 constitute roughly 0.5% of the world's Muslim population.

Law
In matters of Islamic jurisprudence, the Zaydis follow Zayd ibn ’Ali's teachings which are documented in his book Majmu’ Al-Fiqh. Zaydi fiqh is similar to the Hanafi school of Sunni Islamic jurisprudence, as well as the Ibadi school. Abu Hanifa, the Shaykh of the Hanafi school of Sunni Islamic Jurisprudence, was favorable and even donated towards the Zaydi cause. Zaydis dismiss religious dissimulation (taqiyya).

Theology

In matters of theology, the Zaydis are close to the Mu'tazili school, though they are not exactly Mu'tazilite. There are a few issues between both schools, most notably the Zaydi doctrine of the Imamate, which is rejected by the Mu'tazilites. Of the Shi'a sects, Zaydi fiqh is most similar to the Ibadis, since Zaydism shares similar doctrines and jurisprudential opinions with those scholars.

Zaydis’ theological literature puts an emphasis on justice and human responsibility, and its political implications, i.e. Muslims have an ethical and legal obligation by their religion to rise up and depose unjust leaders including unrighteous sultans and caliphs.

Beliefs

In the context of the Shi'a belief in spiritual leadership or Imamate, Zaydis believe that the leader of the Ummah or Muslim community must be Fatimids: descendants of Muhammad through his only surviving daughter Fatimah, whose sons were Hasan ibn ʻAlī and Husayn ibn ʻAlī. These Shi'a called themselves Zaydi to differentiate themselves from other Shias who refused to take up arms with Zayd ibn Ali.

Zaydis believe Zayd ibn Ali was the rightful successor to the Imamate because he led a rebellion against the Umayyad Caliphate, who he believed were tyrannical and corrupt. Muhammad al-Baqir did not engage in political action and the followers of Zayd believed that a true Imām must fight against corrupt rulers. The renowned Muslim jurist Abu Hanifa, who is with founding the Hanafi school of Sunni Islam, delivered a fatwā or legal statement in favour of Zayd in his rebellion against the Umayyad ruler. He also urged people in secret to join the uprising and delivered funds to Zayd.

Unlike the Twelver and Isma'ili Shia, Zaydis do not believe in the infallibility of Imams and do not believe that the Imamate must pass from father to son but believe it can be held by any descendant of Hasan ibn ʻAlī or Husayn ibn ʻAlī.

Zaydis reject anthropomorphism and instead, take a rationalist approach to scriptural uses of anthropomorphic expressions, as illustrated in works such as the Kitāb al-Mustarshid by the 9th-century Zaydi imam Al-Qasim al-Rassi.

History

Status of Caliphs and the Sahaba
There was a difference of opinion among the companions and supporters of Zayd ibn 'Ali, such as Abu al-Jarud Ziyad ibn Abi Ziyad, Sulayman ibn Jarir, Kathir al-Nawa al-Abtar and Hasan ibn Salih, concerning the status of the first three Caliphs who succeeded to the political and administrative authority of Muhammad. The earliest group, called Jarudiyya (named for Abu al-Jarud Ziyad ibn Abi Ziyad), was opposed to the approval of certain companions of Muhammad. They held that there was sufficient description given by the Prophet that all should have recognized 'Ali as the rightful Caliph. They therefore consider the Companions wrong in failing to recognise 'Ali as the legitimate Caliph and deny legitimacy to Abu Bakr, 'Umar and 'Uthman; however, they avoid accusing them.

The Jarudiyya were active during the late Umayyad Caliphate and early Abbasid Caliphate. Its views, although predominant among the later Zaydis, especially in Yemen under the Hadawi sub-sect, became extinct in Iraq and Iran due to forced conversion of the present religious sects to Twelver Shi'ism by the Safavid dynasty.

The second group, the Sulaymaniyya, named for Sulayman ibn Jarir, held that the Imamate should be a matter to be decided by consultation. They felt that the companions, including Abu Bakr and 'Umar, had been in error in failing to follow 'Ali but it did not amount to sin.

The third group is known as the Tabiriyya, Batriyya or Salihiyya for Kathir an-Nawa al-Abtar and Hasan ibn Salih. Their beliefs are virtually identical to those of the Sulaymaniyya, except they see Uthman also as in error but not in sin.

Non-Zaidi accounts state the term Rafida was a term used by Zayd ibn Ali on those who rejected him in his last hours for his refusal to condemn the first two Caliphs of the Muslim world, Abu Bakr and Umar. Zayd bitterly scolds the "rejectors" (Rafidha) who deserted him, an appellation used by Salafis to refer to Twelver Shi'ites to this day.

Twelver Shia references to Zayd
While not one of the 12 Imams embraced by the Twelver denomination and current largest branch of Shi'ite Islam, Zayd ibn Ali features in historical accounts within Twelver literature in a positive light.

In Twelver Shia accounts, Imam Ali al-Ridha narrated how his grandfather Ja'far al-Sadiq also supported Zayd ibn Ali's struggle:

Jafar al-Sadiq's love for Zayd ibn Ali was so immense, he broke down and cried upon reading the letter informing him of his death and proclaimed:

Empires

Justanids
The Justanids (Persian: جستانیان) were the rulers of a part of Daylam (the mountainous district of Gilan) from 791 to the late 11th century. After Marzuban ibn Justan converted to Islam in 805, the ancient family of Justan's became connected to the Zaydi Alids of the Daylam region. The Justanids adopted the Zaydi form of Shi'ism.

Karkiya dynasty
The Karkiya dynasty, or Kia dynasty, was a Zaydi Shia dynasty which ruled over Bia pish (eastern Gilan) from the 1370s to 1592. They claimed Sasanian ancestry as well.

Alid dynasty
Alid dynasty of Tabaristan. See Alid dynasties of northern Iran.

Idrisid dynasty

The Idrisid dynasty was a Zaydi dynasty centered around modern-day Morocco. It was named after its first leader Idris I.

Banu Ukhaidhir
The Banu Ukhaidhir was a dynasty that ruled in al-Yamamah (central Arabia) from 867 to at least the mid-eleventh century.

Hammudid dynasty
The Hammudid dynasty was a Zaydi dynasty in the 11th century in southern Spain.

Muttawakili

Muttawakili Kingdom, also known as the Kingdom of Yemen or, retrospectively, as North Yemen, existed between 1918 and 1962 in the northern part of what is now Yemen. Its capital was Sana`a until 1948, then Ta'izz.

Community and former States
Since the earliest form of Zaydism was Jaroudiah, many of the first Zaidi states were supporters of its position, such as those of the Iranian Alavids of Mazandaran Province and the Buyid dynasty of Gilan Province and the Arab dynasties of the Banu Ukhaidhir of al-Yamama (modern Saudi Arabia) and the Rassids of Yemen. The Idrisid dynasty in the western Maghreb were another Arab Zaydi dynasty, ruling 788–985.

The Alavids established a Zaydi state in Deylaman and Tabaristan (northern Iran) in 864; it lasted until the death of its leader at the hand of the Sunni Samanids in 928. Roughly forty years later, the state was revived in Gilan (Northwest Iran) and survived until 1126.

From the 12th-13th centuries, Zaydi communities acknowledged the Imams of Yemen or rival Imams within Iran.

The Buyid dynasty was initially Zaidi as were the Banu Ukhaidhir rulers of al-Yamama in the 9th and 10th centuries.

The leader of the Zaidi community took the title of Caliph. As such, the ruler of Yemen was known as the Caliph. Al-Hadi ila'l-Haqq Yahya, a descendant of Imam Hasan ibn Ali, founded this Rassid state at Sa'da, al-Yaman, in c. 893–7. The Rassid Imamate continued until the middle of the 20th century, when a 1962 revolution deposed the Imam. After the fall of the Zaydi Imamate in 1962 many Zaydi Shia in northern Yemen had converted to Sunni Islam.

The Rassid state was founded under Jarudiyya thought; however, increasing interactions with Hanafi and Shafi'i schools of Sunni Islam led to a shift to Sulaimaniyyah thought, especially among the Hadawi sub-sect.

In the 21st century, the most prominent Zaidi movement is the Shabab Al Mu'mineen, commonly known as Houthis, who have been engaged in an uprising against the Yemeni Government in which the Army has lost 743 men and thousands of innocent civilians have been killed or displaced by government forces and Houthi, causing a grave humanitarian crisis in north Yemen.

Some Persian and Arab legends record that Zaidis fled to China from the Umayyads during the 8th century.

Houthi Yemen

Since 2004 in Yemen, Zaidi fighters have been waging an uprising against factions belonging to the Sunni majority group in the country. The Houthis, as they are often called, have asserted that their actions are for the defense of their community from the government and discrimination, though the Yemeni government in turn accused them of wishing to bring it down and institute religious law.

On 21 September 2014, an agreement was signed in Sana'a under UN patronage essentially giving the Houthis control of the government after a decade of conflict. Tribal militias then moved swiftly to consolidate their position in the capital, with the group officially declaring direct control over the state on 6 February 2015. This outcome followed the removal of Yemen's President Ali Abdullah Saleh in 2012 in the wake of protracted Arab Spring protests. Saudi Arabia has exercised the predominant external influence in Yemen since the withdrawal of Nasser's Egyptian expeditionary force marking the end of the bitter North Yemen Civil War.

There is a wide array of domestic opponents to Houthi rule in Yemen, ranging from the conservative Sunni Islah Party to the secular socialist Southern Movement to the radical Islamists of Al Qaeda in the Arabian Peninsula and now ISIS in Yemen.

Imams of Zaidis
The Imams of Yemen constitute one line of Zaidi imams.

A timeline indicating Zaidi Imams in the early period amongst other Shia Imams as listed in Al-Masaabeeh fee As-Seerah by Ahmad bin Ibrahim is as follows:

 Ali ibn Abi Talib
 Al-Hasan ibn Ali ibn Abi Talib
 Al-Husayn ibn Ali ibn Abi Talib
Ali Zayn al-Abidin ibn Al-Husayn ibn Ali
 Hasan al-Muthana ibn Al-Hasan ibn Ali
 Zayd ibn Ali ibn Al-Husayn
 Yahya ibn Zayd ibn Ali
 Muhammad ibn Abdullah ibn Hasan al-Muthana
 Ibrahim ibn Abdullah ibn Hasan al-Muthana
 Abdullah ibn Muhammad ibn Abdullah
 Al-Hasan ibn Ibrahim ibn Abdullah
 Al-Husayn ibn Ali ibn Hasan al-Muthalath ibn Hasan al-Muthana
 Isa ibn Zayd ibn Ali
 Yahya ibn Abdullah ibn Hasan Al-Muthana
 Idris I ibn Abdullah ibn Hasan al-Muthana
 Muhammad ibn Ibrahim ibn Isma'il ibn Ibrahim ibn Hasan al-Muthana
 Muhammad ibn Muhammad ibn Zayd
 Muhammad ibn Sulayman ibn Dawud ibn Hasan Al-Muthana
 Al-Qasim ibn Ibrahim ibn Isma'il
 Yahya ibn Al-Husayn ibn Al-Qasim ibn Ibrahim
 Muhammad ibn Yahya ibn Al-Husayn
 Ahmad ibn Yahya ibn Al-Husayn
 Al-Hasan ibn Ahmad ibn Yahya
 Yahya ibn Umar ibn Yahya ibn Al-Husayn
 Al-Hasan ibn Zayd ibn Muhammad ibn Isma'il ibn Hasan
 Muhammad ibn Zayd ibn Muhammad
 Al-Hasan ibn Ali ibn Al-Hasan ibn Ali ibn Umar al-Ashraf ibn Ali
 Hasan ibn Al-Qasim ibn Ali ibn Abd al-Rahman ibn Al-Qasim ibn Muhammad ibn Al-Qasim ibn Hasan or Abu Muhammad Hasan ibn Qasim
 Ahmad ibn Hasan or Abu 'l-Husayn Ahmad ibn Hasan
 Ja'far ibn Hasan or Abu 'l-Qasim Ja'far ibn Hasan
 Muhammad ibn Ahmad or Abu Ali Muhammad ibn Ahmad
 Husayn ibn Ahmad or Abu Ja'far Husayn ibn Ahmad
 Muhammad ibn Yusuf al-Ukhaidhir ibn Ibrahim ibn Musa ibn Abdullah ibn Hasan al-Muthana
 Yusuf ibn Muhammad ibn Yusuf al-Ukhaidir
 Isma'il ibn Yusuf ibn Muhammad
 Al-Hasan ibn Yusuf ibn Muhammad
 Ahmad ibn Al-Hasan ibn Yusuf
 Abu 'l-Muqallid Ja'far ibn Ahmad ibn Al-Hasan
 Idris II ibn Idris I
 Muhammad ibn Idris II
 Ali I ibn Muhammad
 Yahya I ibn Muhammad
 Yahya II ibn Yahya I
 Ali II ibn Umar ibn Idris II
 Yahya III ibn Al-Qasim ibn Idris II
 Yahya IV ibn Idris ibn Umar ibn Idris II
 Al-Hasan I ibn Muhammad ibn Al-Qasim ibn Idris II
 Al-Qasim Guennoun ibn Muhammad ibn Al-Qasim ibn Idris II
 Abul-Aish Ahmad ibn Al-Qasim Guennoun
 Al-Hasan II ibn Al-Qasim Guennoun
 Imam Sayyed al Afghani

See also
 Imams of Yemen
 Dukayniyya Shia
 Khalafiyya Shia
 Khashabiyya Shia
 Islamic history of Yemen
 Zaidi (surname)

References

Further reading
 Cornelis van Arendonk: Les débuts de l'imamat zaidite au Yemen, Leyden, Brill 1960

External links
 Zaidi Portal
 Majalis Aal Mohammed
 Salvation Ark
 Zaidiyyah
 Zaidiyyah Blog
 Zaydiyya from wikishia.net

 
Islamic history of Yemen
Shia Islamic branches